Monoporus may refer to:
 Monoporus (plant), a genus of plants in the family Primulaceae
 Monoporus, a genus of branchiopods in the family Chydoridae, synonym of Monope
 Monoporus, a genus of worms in the family Otocelididae, synonym of Otocelis